The Corn Bowl Conference was a high school athletic conference in based north central Iowa. The conference is made up of 1A and 2A schools, the two smallest classification of schools in Iowa.

Beginning in 2015-16, the Corn Bowl Conference and the North Iowa Conference will merge into the Top of Iowa Conference. There will be two divisions. The Top of Iowa - East will include Osage, Mason City Newman, West Fork, North Butler, Central Springs, Northwood-Kensett, Rockford, Nashua-Plainfield, and Saint Ansgar. The Top of Iowa - West will include Eagle Grove, Belmond-Klemme, Garner-Hayfield-Ventura, Forest City, West Hancock, Lake Mills, North Iowa, Algona Bishop Garrigan, and North Union. Riceville will join the Iowa Star Conference that same year. Clarion-Goldfield-Dows has also been involved in talks with the North Iowa Conference but has not acted on changing conference affiliation.

Members

Modern History
In 2000, there were eight schools in the conference. These eight were Greene, Nashua-Plainfield, North Central in Manly, Nora Springs-Rock Falls, Riceville, Rockford, Rockwell-Swaledale, and Saint Ansgar. In 2002, the league got two new members: Northwood-Kensett left the North Iowa Conference for the Corn Bowl, while SCMT in Sheffield joined from the North Star Conference. In 2004, Greene merged with Allison-Bristow to become North Butler, remaining in the conference. In 2007, North Central and Nora Springs-Rock Falls joined together to become the Central Springs school district, dropping league membership to nine schools. The following year that number dropped to eight, as two more league schools, Rockwell-Swaledale and SCMT joined to become West Fork. 

The recent success of the conference includes Northwood-Kensett's state championship in men's basketball in 2006-07, North Butler's state championships in women's basketball in 05-06 and 06-07, West Fork's 2011 2A state championship in men's basketball, Nashua-Plainfield's 1A state dual wrestling titles in 2004 and 2012, and St. Ansgar's 1A football state championship in 2011.

Riceville Community School District voted unanimously to join the Iowa Star Conference. Riceville would join the Iowa Star in 2015.

References

External links

 Official site

High school sports in Iowa